"Pep Rally" is a song by American recording artist Missy Elliott. It was released by The Goldmind Inc. and Atlantic Records on February 7, 2016, as a single. The song is heard in a commercial for Amazon's Echo speaker, which features Elliott as well as actors Alec Baldwin and Jason Schwartzman. "Pep Rally" is also featured in a 2019 Gatorade commercial with Dwyane Wade and Gabrielle Union.

Critical reception 
In a retrospetive review of the song, Steven J. Horowitz fom Vulture called the song "a drumline knocker released via an Amazon Echo commercial. It's more in line with the late-era, party-starting fare of [Elliott's] catalogue, with bits of bounce thrown in for good measure."

Charts

Release history

References

2016 singles
2016 songs
Missy Elliott songs
Atlantic Records singles
The Goldmind Inc. singles
Song recordings produced by Pharrell Williams
Songs written by Pharrell Williams